Bourbon Street Parade is a popular jazz song written by drummer Paul Barbarin in 1949. The song is an example of how early marching bands influenced New Orleans jazz. It has become a Dixieland classic and New Orleans Jazz standard.

It is often performed as part of "Second line" parades in New Orleans. This song was performed by Paul Barbarin & His New Orleans Jazz Band. The melody of Won't You Come Home Bill Bailey can be played simultaneously with Bourbon Street Parade and makes a pleasing counterpoint. 
From 1954 till the end of his career, Bourbon Street Parade was the signature song of every concert of the Chris Barber Jazz Band.

Notable recordings 

 Louis Armstrong
 Lucien Barbarin
 Chris Barber
 James Chirillo
 Harry Connick Jr
 Louis Cottrell, Jr
 Dukes of Dixieland
 Al Hirt
 The Hot Sardines
 Wynton Marsalis
 Preservation Hall Jazz Band
 Wilbur de Paris (recorded 1952)

Further reading

References

Songs about streets
Songs about New Orleans
Dixieland jazz standards
1955 songs